Pioneer Place is an upscale, urban shopping mall in downtown Portland, Oregon. It consists of four blocks of retail, dining, parking, and an office tower named Pioneer Tower. The mall itself is spread out between four buildings, interconnected by skywalks or underground mall sections. The footprint of the entire complex consists of four full city blocks, bisected by SW Yamhill and Fourth, bounded north-south by SW Morrison and Taylor Streets and east-west by SW Third and Fifth Avenues. In 2014, Pioneer Place was the third-highest selling mall in the United States based on sales per square foot, sitting just behind Bal Harbour Shops and The Grove at Farmers Market.

History

Pioneer Place I began construction in the late 1980s and opened in 1990.

The development was built in two phases, the names of which are reflected in the names of the two main mall buildings. Pioneer Place I, or The "Atrium Shops"/Zone A, opened in 1990 and was developed with assistance from the Portland Development Commission. Pioneer Place II, or The "Rotunda Shops"/Zone B, is located across Fourth Avenue to the east. Construction on Pioneer Place II began in 1998, and at the time was to add  at a cost of around $60 million.

Saks Fifth Avenue closed its store at the mall in 2010, with H&M taking over the portion that had been Saks men's store later that year. The remaining parts of the Saks footprint was demolished in 2012 to make way for a new Apple Store and a Yard House restaurant.

In February 2017, shared workspaces provider WeWork signed a lease to take  of space, one of their first leases in a mall.

Amenities

The center has  of space and 66 stores. Pioneer Place I and II contain four levels, including a basement level. The top floor of Pioneer Place II houses a Regal Cinemas theater.

Cascades, the food court, is located underground below Pioneer Tower/Zone C, which also connects to a parking garage. That parking garage, located to the south, also contains retail space, home to Tiffany & Co. The northern lower above-ground levels of the block with Pioneer Tower housed Saks Fifth Avenue.

Public transit

Pioneer Place I faces the Fifth Avenue section of the Portland Transit Mall, served by several TriMet bus routes and MAX Light Rail. It is served by all five lines of the MAX system, with its Fifth Avenue side being across the street from the Pioneer Place/5th Avenue station (southbound service), and with the Pioneer Courthouse/6th Avenue station (northbound service) and "Pioneer Square" stations (eastbound and westbound service) being only one block away. Pioneer Place II is similarly only one block away from the Third Avenue station. Until 2020, building I had been flanked by directly adjacent MAX stations on Morrison and Yamhill Streets since its opening 30 years earlier, but those stations were closed in 2020 in order to reduce travel time for MAX riders through downtown and due to the stations' close proximity to the nearest other stations on the same MAX lines.

See also
List of shopping malls in Oregon

References

External links 

 

1990 establishments in Oregon
Brookfield Properties
Shopping centers in Portland, Oregon
Shopping malls established in 1990
Southwest Portland, Oregon